Serrivomer is a genus of deep-sea eel in the family Serrivomeridae. It contains ten described species. Member species are distributed widely, being found in the Atlantic, Pacific and Indian Oceans. The smallest species in this genus is Serrivomer jesperseni, which has a maximum length of 40.6 cm; the largest species in this genus is Serrivomer beanii with a maximum length of 78 cm. Most members reach a maximum length of 60–70 cm,

Species
 Serrivomer beanii T. N. Gill & Ryder, 1883 (Bean's sawtooth eel)
 Serrivomer bertini Bauchot, 1959 (Thread eel)
 Serrivomer brevidentatus (Roule & Bertin, 1929) (Black sawtooth eel)
 Serrivomer danae (Roule & Bertin, 1924)
 Serrivomer garmani Bertin, 1944
 Serrivomer jesperseni Bauchot-Boutin, 1953 (Crossthroat sawpalate)
 Serrivomer lanceolatoides (E. J. Schmidt, 1916) (Short-tooth sawpalate)
 Serrivomer samoensis Bauchot, 1959 (Samoa sawtooth eel)
 Serrivomer schmidti Bauchot-Boutin, 1953
 Serrivomer sector Garman, 1899

References

 

Serrivomeridae
Marine fish genera
Taxa named by Theodore Gill
Taxa named by John A. Ryder